Respect is a 2021 American biographical musical drama film directed by Liesl Tommy (in her feature directorial debut), written by Tracey Scott Wilson and Callie Khouri, based on the life of American singer Aretha Franklin. The film stars Jennifer Hudson as Franklin, with Forest Whitaker, Marlon Wayans, Audra McDonald, Marc Maron, Tituss Burgess, and Mary J. Blige in supporting roles. The film follows the first three decades of Franklin's life, from being born as a musical prodigy in an affluent African-American family, the repercussions of losing her mother at age 10 to her arduous rise to international musical stardom, while enduring an abusive marriage, ultimately concluding with the recording of her influential live album Amazing Grace (1972).

A film on Franklin's life was in development for a long time with Franklin herself involved in the pre-production, however the film languished in development hell for years due to lack of finding a suitable candidate. Following release of the musical film Dreamgirls (2006), Franklin asked Hudson to play her but did not finalize her decision until seeing her in the Broadway musical The Color Purple. The film began production in early 2019 and had concluded by February 2020. The film is dedicated to Franklin, who died in 2018.

After much delay and postponement, due to the burgeoning COVID-19 pandemic, Respect premiered in Los Angeles on August 8, 2021, and was released theatrically in the United States on August 13, 2021, by United Artists Releasing, and in other territories by Universal Pictures. The film received generally positive reviews from critics, with praise for the performances, the film's production values, and costume design, but received criticism for its screenplay and runtime.

Plot
 
In 1952, 10-year-old Aretha Franklin lives with her father C.L., pastor of Detroit’s largest Baptist church, and her siblings Cecil, Erma, and Carolyn. Aretha’s father often has her sing for parties at their home, while her mother Barbara, separated from C.L., encourages her independence. The predatory actions of a family friend, combined with the sudden death of Barbara, traumatizes Aretha, who ceases to speak for weeks until her father demands that she sing at church.

Seven years later, Aretha is a teen mother of two boys, but refuses to name their father. Touring as a gospel singer with family friend Dr. Martin Luther King, Jr., she meets local producer Ted White, but C.L. warns him to stay away. C.L. surprises Aretha with a meeting with Columbia Records executive John Hammond. She accepts a contract to record jazz standards, including "Ac-Cent-Tchu-Ate the Positive."

Four albums later, Aretha lacks a signature hit. At a club, she attempts to honor family friend Dinah Washington by performing one of Dinah’s songs; outraged, Dinah advises Aretha to find songs that move her. Struggling with the controlling influence of her father, Aretha begins a relationship with Ted. She brings him home to meet her family, leading C.L. to nearly shoot him, but announces Ted as her manager.

Two years later, Ted and Aretha are married with a child. After nine albums with no real success, Aretha is dropped by Columbia. Ted secures a deal with veteran producer Jerry Wexler of Atlantic Records, who introduces her to a group of white musicians in Muscle Shoals in 1967. There, Aretha records "I Never Loved A Man (The Way I Love You)", but a jealous Ted becomes violent with her.

Returning to Detroit with a black eye, Aretha reconnects with her family. Realizing her song has been released, becoming her first hit, Aretha takes a more hands-on role in her career. She makes her sisters her new backup singers and, despite their misgivings, reunites with Ted. Aretha and Carolyn are inspired to re-arrange Otis Redding's "Respect"; their version becomes a #1 single, launching Aretha to stardom by her 25th birthday.

At a Detroit concert, Dr. King honors Aretha for her support of the Civil Rights Movement, proclaiming February 16 "Aretha Franklin Day". She has another signature hit, "(You Make Me Feel Like) A Natural Woman", but her career is complicated by Ted’s increasingly volatile behavior. Embarking on a European tour in 1968, Aretha is confronted with a Time magazine cover story about Ted’s abuse, and finally casts him out of her life.

Dating her tour manager Ken Cunningham, Aretha eventually has her fourth child. In the wake of Dr. King's assassination, Aretha's father drunkenly argues with her over the direction of the Movement, telling her that she no longer walks in the spirit. Aretha continues to release hits but overworks herself, coping with the pressure through alcohol, and rejects her family’s attempts to help her.

During another overseas performance, a drunken Aretha falls from the stage. On a downward spiral and estranged from Ken and her family, she is consoled by a vision of her late mother. Aretha finds the strength to quit drinking, leading Ken to reconcile with her, and returns to her gospel roots. She approaches Wexler with the idea to produce her own gospel album, and he agrees on the condition that the recording of the album be filmed for a documentary.

Beginning rehearsals, Aretha confides in family friend James Cleveland, now a respected gospel artist. The day of the album’s recording, her father arrives to reconcile with her. The service begins and, with her family in attendance, Aretha sings her arrangement of the hymn, Amazing Grace. An epilogue reveals Aretha Franklin’s legacy as a world-famous artist and the “Queen of Soul”.

Cast
 Jennifer Hudson as Aretha Franklin
Skye Dakota Turner as young Aretha
 Forest Whitaker as C. L. Franklin, Aretha's father
 Marlon Wayans as Ted White, Aretha's abusive husband and manager
 Audra McDonald as Barbara Siggers Franklin, Aretha's mother
 Marc Maron as Jerry Wexler
 Albert Jones as Ken Cunningham
 Leroy McClain as Cecil Franklin, Aretha's older brother
 Tituss Burgess as James Cleveland
 Saycon Sengbloh as Erma Franklin, Aretha's older sister
 Hailey Kilgore as Carolyn Franklin, Aretha's younger sister
 Tate Donovan as John Hammond
 Mary J. Blige as Dinah Washington
 Kelvin Hair as Sam Cooke
 Heather Headley as Clara Ward
 Lodric D. Collins as Smokey Robinson
 Gilbert Glenn Brown as Martin Luther King Jr.
 Brenda Nicole Moorer as Brenda Franklin-Corbett, Aretha's cousin
 Jelani Alladin, as Jason

Production
The project had been long in development, with Jennifer Hudson set to play Aretha Franklin. Franklin herself was involved with the development up until her death on August 16, 2018. She stated that Hudson would win an Oscar for the portrayal. In January 2019, Liesl Tommy was set to direct the film. The rest of the cast was added in October 2019, including Forest Whitaker, Marlon Wayans, Audra McDonald and Mary J. Blige.

In a June 2019 slate deal, MGM added Bron Creative as a co-financing and producing company to this film. Filming began in Atlanta, Georgia, on September 2, 2019, and wrapped on February 15, 2020. Jonathan Glickman, MGM's President of the Motion Picture Group, exited the company on February 1, 2020, with a first-look deal starting with the film.

Soundtrack
The film's soundtrack features one original song, "Here I Am (Singing My Way Home)", performed by Hudson. Written by Hudson, Carole King, and Jamie Hartman and produced by will.i.am and Johnny Goldstein, the song was released on June 18, 2021. "Here I Am (Singing My Way Home)" peaked at number 21 on the Billboard Adult R&B Songs chart dated August 28, 2021. The soundtrack album was released on August 13 via Epic Records.

Release
Respect premiered in Los Angeles on August 8, 2021, and was theatrically released in the United States on August 13, 2021. It was originally scheduled for a limited release on December 25, 2020, followed by an expansion on January 8, 2021, before going wide the following week. Due to the COVID-19 pandemic, it was switched to a sole wide release on January 15, without a limited release, before it was delayed again to August 2021. Previous release dates also included August 14, 2020, and October 9.

The film screened at the 74th Locarno Film Festival, in the Piazza Grande section to be held from August 4 to 14.

Home media
The film was released digitally on August 27, 2021 and on Blu-ray and  DVD by Universal Pictures Home Entertainment on November 9, 2021.

Reception

Box office
Respect grossed $24.3 million in the United States and Canada, and $8.7 million in other territories, for a worldwide total of $33 million.

In the United States and Canada, Respect was released alongside Free Guy and Don't Breathe 2, and was projected to gross around $10 million from 3,207 theaters in its opening weekend. The film made $3.6 million on its first day, including $650,000 from Thursday night previews. It went on to debut to $8.8 million, finishing fourth at the box office. Despite the film's targeted demographics of older, female, and African-American audiences all being among the most-reluctant to attend a theater amid the pandemic, the film's opening weekend audience was 63% female and 47% African American, with 86% being over the age of 25. The film made $3.8 million in its second weekend (a drop of 57%), finishing fifth, then made $2.2 million in its third weekend.

Outside the U.S., the film's largest opening was in Australia, grossing nearly $1 million in its first weekend. It finished third in the U.K. with $500,000, and debuted to $450,000 in France.

Critical response
The website's critics consensus reads: "This standard-issue biopic falls shy of its subject's transcendent brilliance, but Jennifer Hudson's starring performance absolutely commands Respect." On Metacritic, the film has an aggregate score of 61 out of 100 based on 43 critics, indicating "generally favorable reviews". Audiences polled by CinemaScore gave the film an average grade of "A" on an A+ to F scale, while PostTrak reported filmgoers gave it an 89% positive score.

In a positive review from The New York Times, Manohla Dargis stated that the film "finds its own groove" and praised the performances of Mary J. Blige and Jennifer Hudson." Odie Henderson of RogerEbert.com gave the film a score of 3 out of 4 stars, writing that "Hudson performs with the same tireless intensity Re was known for throughout her career. It's a damn entertaining movie." Henderson also said "There's a fair amount of ugliness in Franklin's story—sexual assault, domestic abuse, alcoholism—and it's to the film's credit that it resists the temptation to treat these issues salaciously. But Respect never goes deeper than a surface-level exploration of how these traumas affected Franklin."

Writing for Variety, Peter Debruge called the film an "overly respectful biopic [that] steers clear of revealing the traumas that shaped the soul legend" and said: "Though Respect can feel a little soft in the drama department, it delivers the added pleasure of hearing Hudson re-create Franklin's key songs, from the early jazz standards she covered for Columbia to her reinvention of the Otis Redding single that lends the film its name." Also writing for Variety, Cassie Da Costa praised Hudson's portrayal of Franklin, saying: "Bringing an incredible mix of gestural subtlety and musical power, it cannot be said enough what Hudson achieves here by transmitting a rich sense of interiority, staying true to who Franklin was in private with every look given, word spoken, and melisma sung."

Pete Hammond of Deadline also praised Hudson's performance, saying; "This is Jennifer Hudson's triumph merged with the spirit and guidance from an even greater voice above. Hudson's performance is an electrifying sight to behold." Sasha Stone from Awards Daily, praised the film and especially Hudson's performance, saying: "Hudson's performance is partly her incredible voice. She suspends time in reverie whenever she sings. But this performance also establishes her as an actress capable of navigating the ever-changing waters of Franklin's complicated life—from a young wife who doesn't quite understand exactly what kind of gift she actually has, through to finding a way to honor her own creative spirit." Writing for Time, Stephanie Zacharek called Respect "both entertaining and emotionally revelatory" and praised the performances of the cast, especially Hudson's, saying: "It's Hudson's job to play the adult version of that girl, and she shoulders it with something like tenderness. The easy thing, when you're playing a strong, potent character, is to bite down; Hudson never does. This is a terrific performance, underplayed in all the right ways, an emotionally detailed portrait of a woman who knew what she wanted and knew she could deliver—but who also moved through life knowing that she'd been cruelly robbed of that thing we so sentimentally call childhood."

Accolades

Notes

References

External links
 
 
 Official screenplay

Aretha Franklin
2021 films
2021 biographical drama films
2021 directorial debut films
American biographical drama films
African-American films
African-American biographical dramas
Biographical films about singers
Biographical films about entertainers
Biographical films about people in arts occupations
Bron Studios films
Canadian biographical drama films
Films about music and musicians
Films postponed due to the COVID-19 pandemic
Films scored by Kris Bowers
Films set in Alabama
Films set in Detroit
Films set in Los Angeles
Films set in New York City
Films set in the 1950s
Films set in the 1960s
Films set in the 1970s
Films shot in Georgia (U.S. state)
Metro-Goldwyn-Mayer films
Musical films based on actual events
Universal Pictures films
2020s English-language films
2020s Canadian films
2020s American films
Cultural depictions of soul musicians